Operation Mallorca was a United States Drug Enforcement Administration investigation, which targeted money laundering operations of Colombian drug traffickers, which resulted in the arrests of 36 people.

See also
 Plan Colombia
 War on Drugs

References

2005 in Colombia
Drug Enforcement Administration operations
Operations against organized crime in the United States